The 1978 Limerick Senior Hurling Championship was the 84th staging of the Limerick Senior Hurling Championship since its establishment by the Limerick County Board.

Patrickswell were the defending champions.

South Liberties won the championship after a 2-09 to 2-05 defeat of Bruree in the final. It was their sixth championship title overall and their first title in two years.

References

Limerick Senior Hurling Championship
Limerick Senior Hurling Championship